Ben Allen Tamburello, Jr. (born September 9, 1964) is a former American football guard and center who played for five seasons in the National Football League (NFL). He played for the Philadelphia Eagles from 1987–1991. He was drafted by the Eagles in the third round of the 1987 NFL Draft. He played college football at Auburn.

Early years
Tamburello was born in Birmingham, Alabama.  He attended Shades Valley High School in Homewood, Alabama, and Tennessee Military Institute in Sweetwater, Tennessee.

College career
Tamburello was recruited by Paul "Bear" Bryant to play college football for Alabama, but decided to play for Auburn. He played for the Tigers from 1983–1986. In 1986, he was named a unanimous  All-American. He won the SEC Lineman of the Year award in 1986 and was named a team captain.

Professional career

Philadelphia Eagles
Tamburello was drafted by the Philadelphia Eagles in the third round (65th overall) of the 1987 NFL Draft. He played for the Eagles from 1987–1991.

After football
Tamburello works in real estate and resides in Birmingham with his wife, Katy, and his three children: Ben III, Anna and Julia.

References

1964 births
Living people
Players of American football from Birmingham, Alabama
All-American college football players
American football offensive guards
American football centers
Auburn Tigers football players
Philadelphia Eagles players